The California-Nevada-Hawaii District Key Club International, Cali-Nev-Ha, or simply CNH is a governing body of Key Club International, a youth sponsored community service organization of Kiwanis International, local Kiwanis clubs and school districts across the state.

The CNH District is the largest district in Key Club International, with nearly 45,500 members.  It was in Sacramento, California where Key Club was first founded in 1925.

The CNH mascot is the bee.

Currently, the district consists of 80 divisions spread throughout the three states.

History
In 1924, Sacramento High School in Sacramento, California was in trouble. Destructive clubs and fraternities, although outlawed, moved underground and continued to exercise a negative influence on the student population. Educators and community leaders feared these detrimental effects and sought some means of replacing the clubs with wholesome youth activities. The principal and a faculty member thought that what the school needed was an organization of students that discouraged delinquency by its example. Mr. Vincent asked the local Kiwanis Club for help and, together, they decided to pattern the new group after Kiwanis.
 
The idea of a junior service club similar to Kiwanis was presented to the school in 1924, but it was not put into practice until eleven students signed a petition on March 25, 1925 which was sent to the Kiwanis International office with a request to be chartered as a Junior Kiwanis Club. By the time the charter was granted and the club held its first meeting, the membership had grown to twenty-five members. Through this group, Kiwanis hoped to provide vocational guidance to the students of the entire school.

The club became known as the Key Club because of the positive influence of these key students who held luncheon meetings each week to which Kiwanians came as guest speakers. Key Club members also attended Kiwanis meetings, thus bringing these young men into constant contact with the business and professional men of the community.

As the experience of the Key Club grew, the club became a complete service organization open to the whole school. A social program was offered to balance its service activities. Over the following years, Key Club went through a period of expansion by word-of-mouth. Other communities throughout the United States started Key Clubs patterned after the one in Sacramento High School. By 1939, about fifty Key Clubs were chartered, many of them in the Southern United States. 

The first five clubs officially chartered by Key Club International were those of Sacramento, Monterrey, Oakland Technical, Hemet, and Stockton (now Edison) High Schools. Since Key Club was growing in the area of its birth, and a few clubs existed in neighboring Nevada, by 1947 it was decided that a district should be formed. The first step was to hold a conference in San Diego in October to which all the California Key Clubs and Kiwanis Clubs were invited. A full slate of officers was elected and a set of district bylaws and a constitution were adopted. John Cooper of Oakland Technical High School was the first district governor of the Cali-Nev District. The first official district convention was held in Oakland in March 1948; it was attended by eighty members representing the 23 recognized district Key Clubs. With the chartering of the McKinley High School Key Club in 1952, the district became Cali-Nev-Ha. The first edition of the Cali-Nev-Ha Key appeared on May 1, 1954.

The advent of the new millennium saw the Cali-Nev-Ha Key Club District grow to over 500 clubs with nearly 29,000 members. It continues to grow. As of May, 2012, membership neared 45,500.

Organization
The California-Nevada-Hawai'i District is divided into three main levels of governance: district, division, and club. Divisions are placed into regions, groups of neighboring divisions who are partnered together as an alliance for service within their borders. The highest recognized position is the District Governor with the lowest ranking being the club bulletin editor. Key Club also adopts the inverted pyramid, in which the members are the highest governing body, while the district board and international are the lowest.

District Board

The CNH District Board is similar to all other Key Club International District boards.

A total of five board meetings (initial district convention, spring board, summer board, winter board, and concluding district convention) are held during the Key Club term of one year. The initial assembly of the district board at the initiating district convention is primarily used as a transitional/training conference for the elected lieutenant governors.

Current Executive Board (2022-2023)
 District Governor - Ashley Park
 District Secretary - Abby Jensen
 District Treasurer - Ashlyn Wong

Lt. Governors
A lieutenant-governor has general duties as prescribed by Key Club International. In Cali-Nev-Ha, there may be sixty or more, all of whom, sit on the district board, and constitute a majority.

Each Lt. Governor is assigned to a committee with a specific domain of policy making, each committee is led by an appointed non-Lt. Governor committee chair. The committee focuses range from communications and marketing to service projects. Changes and adoption of policies made by the committees are debated by the Lt. Governors and must be approved by a majority vote in order to pass at a District Board meeting. All Lt. Governors must serve on the Candidate Training Conference Committee of their respective geographical region during their term. Lt. Governors are also expected to appoint a Division Leadership Team composed of executive assistants, a division news editor, and any other positions as they see fit (technology editor, member recognition coordinator, Kiwanis Family relations coordinator, etc.) at the beginning of their term.

Current Lieutenant Governors
 Division 2 North - Sophia Nguyen
 Division 2 South - Gabriela Tadeo
 Division 3 North - Minseo Seo
 Division 3 South - Natalie Fernandez
 Division 4 Central - Sunny Wang
 Division 4 East - Nhi Le
 Division 4 North - Lina Tran
 Division 4 South - Elena Cheung
 Division 4 West - Athena Tan
 Division 5 North - Jude Nieves
 Division 5 South - Aliya Rodriguez
 Division 7 North - Kaitlyn Whang
 Division 7 South - Katelynn Evans
 Division 7 West - Jennifer Hong
 Division 8 - Yuna Bi
 Division 10 North - Annabel Lee
 Division 10 South - Chloe Liu
 Division 11 - Darren Paningbatan
 Division 12 East - Jackie Wang
 Division 12 South - Chloe Ha
 Division 12 West - Jordan Chan
 Division 13 North - Kai Noah Jugo
 Division 13 South - Sierianna-Ahlyzah Chea
 Division 13 West - Janelle Sangmoah
 Division 14 - Arushi Garg
 Division 15 East - Pia Prashanth
 Division 15 North - Gerard Day
 Division 15 South - Chloe Wu
 Division 15 West - Yahir Perez
 Division 16 East - Rain Santos
 Division 16 North - Caleb Kim
 Division 16 South - Joanna Camacho
 Division 16 West - Jaren Jimenez
 Division 18 - Sydney Fifield
 Division 19 North - Rebecca Son
 Division 19 South - Isabelle Nguyen
 Division 20 - Morgan Fu 
 Division 21 - Chloe Kwan
 Division 22 Hikina - Aria Abe
 Division 22 Komohana - Carly Miyamoto
 Division 22 Makai - 
 Division 23 - Pharren Porter
 Division 24/29 - Howard Sardina
 Division 26 North - Stephanie Dumalig
 Division 26 South - Matt Ayabe
 Division 27 North - Jamie Lynn Phan
 Division 27 South - Angelika Irada
 Division 28 East - McKenzie Shelton-Lott
 Division 28 North - Kamya Winbush-Kline
 Division 28 South - Jessica Ryn
 Division 28 West - Ann Margaret De Guzman
 Division 30 North - Alexis Jung
 Division 30 South - Austin Alves
 Division 31 - Madeline Lam
 Division 32 - Diana Nguyen
 Division 33 -
 Division 34 North - John Hillyard
 Division 34 South - Sriya Pillutla
 Division 35 East - Chloe Hartanto
 Division 35 West - Henrina Zhang
 Division 36 East - Kasey Serrano
 Division 36 West - William Lucas
 Division 37 East - Livia Iacobelli
 Division 37 North - Cindy Ngo
 Division 37 South - Minju Kim
 Division 37 West - Asia Chan
 Division 38 East - Nicole Shek
 Division 38 West - Sara-Marie Nuesca
 Division 39 - Brighton Quintana
 Division 42 East - Mijir Chowdarapu
 Division 42 West - Sofia Barajas
 Division 43 - Nathan Rodriguez
 Division 44 North - Justin Kuo
 Division 44 South - Wafa Suhir
 Division 44 West - Ryan Leung
 Division 45 - Artur Gafurov
 Division 46 North - Zoei Quach 
 Division 46 South - Anna Friess
 Division 47 - Daniel Lee

District Leadership Team
There are currently eight active committees and three appointed editors on the District Board. The Committee Chairs are also appointed positions.
District News Editor | Joanne Do
District Technology Editor |
District Video Media Editor | Helena Teung-Ouk
Communications & Marketing Committee | Chair: Amber Zhao
District Convention Committee | Chair: Anh Nguyen
Kiwanis Family & Foundation Committee | Chair: Alyssa Kline
Membership Development & Education Committee | Chair: Joshua Placido
Member Growth Committee | Chair: Chloe Ha
Member Recognition Committee | Chair: Suyeon Hwang
Policy, International, and Elections Committee | Chair: Miah Chao
Service Projects Committee | Chair: Karen Vo

Non-District Board Officers

These are officially recognized positions held at the division and club levels of the district. All club level officers are elected democratically while Division Assistants, News Editors, and other Division Leadership Team officers remain appointed.

Division Officers 
 Division/Executive Assistant
Each Lt. Governor is allowed to appoint one Executive Assistant for every 5 clubs to help maintain the division. Their responsibilities are based on the discretion of the incumbent Lt. Governor and can range from chairing a division project to taking over certain Lt. Governor responsibilities when the current Lt. Governor is unable to achieve their task. Often, underclassmen Executive Assistants run for the Lt. Governor position when the current Lt. Governor's term nears its end.

Island Coordinators
These positions are exclusive to Division 22 Makai in the state of Hawai'i. They are assigned to each of the islands to help administer the division because of the geographic obstacles that prevent the Lt. Governor from constantly attending to each of the individual islands.

Division News Editor

The Division News Editor (DNE) submits Articles and Visuals to the CNH Articles and Visuals Archives, respectfully. The DNE is expected to publish one newsletter monthly that highlights service, recognition, and growth throughout the term.

Club Level Officers 
Club President and Vice President
The Club President and Vice President are responsible for maintaining their high school Key Club. President are typically in charge of running club and officer meeting as well as keeping in good relation with the host school's ASB and Administration as well with the sponsoring Kiwanis Club. Club Presidents train their clubs officer board and are able to delegate tasks to certain individuals as well as set up committees. Ultimate responsibility lies with the president and vice president when reporting to the Division and District.

Club Secretary
The Club Secretary bears the responsibility of recording all club and officer meeting minutes as well as keeping track of all attendees at club administrated events. In the Cali-Nev-Ha District, Secretaries are responsible for submitting a Monthly Report Form (MRF) to the Lt. Governor by the 5th of every month, (the date of submission can be set to an earlier date at the discretion of the Lt. Governor). The submission of the membership roster to Key Club International is also the responsibility of the Secretary and should be a collaborative task with the Treasurer.

Club Treasurer
Financial and monetary business is run and administered by the Club Treasurer. Depending on the monetary policies of the host school or school district, the Treasurer may or may not have access to a private club account. Fundraising for charity as well as the club budget is the responsibility of the Treasurer, they will often work alongside the President when developing blueprints for charity drives or socials. The Club Treasurer works with the Secretary to make sure all club dues are collected and submitted to Key Club International.

Club Bulletin Editor
The Bulletin Editor is in charge of publicizing and promoting club agenda events as well as District and Divisional Projects. Many club Bulletin Editors act as historians, taking pictures at events and meetings; they may be responsible for comprising the club scrapbook at the end of the year.

Club Publicity Officer
To publicize the club and get people to join the club. They make icebreakers, posters, brochures, etc.

Other Officer Positions

Current International Trustee to the California-Nevada-Hawai'i District

Ahmed Eldeeb, Florida District
Ahmed also serves as the International Trustee for the New England-Bermuda and Wisconsin-Upper Michigan Districts.

District and Governor's Project
District Project

A specific project focus selected every other year by the District Project committee made up of members of the District Board. 
Promoting A Healthier Lifestyle (2021-2023) is the current District Project. Clubs throughout the California-Nevada-Hawai'i District are asked to dedicate at least one service event per month to promoting healthier lifestyles among their members. Clubs do these projects throughout the year. The District has certain District Project weeks during the year that clubs throughout the district concentrate on certain aspects of the District project.

Governor's Project

The Governor's Project is still being determined.

District cheers and spirit
Spirit tradition in the district primarily revolves around the "How Do You Feel", Cheer in which a Key Clubber asks another Key Clubber or group of Key Clubbers how they feel, the targets then respond with the cheers answer. Nevada Key Clubbers are known to respond with an "Unga" instead of an "Abooga" while the Kiwins answer with an "Awooga". The "We've got Spirit" Cheer has a universal usage while all other cheers are rarely used as competitive cheers other than at Key Club International Convention. Division often mark their own unique cheers and battle cries to be used against one another at major district events.

How Do You Feel?
We feel good!
Oh!
We feel so good!
We feel fine!
All of the time!
Abooga! Abooga!
Abooga, Booga, Booga!
(Throw your fist over your head during "Abooga" and turn in a circle)

We Got Spirit (against other Key Clubbers)
We've got spirit... Yes we do!
We've got spirit... How 'Bout you!?!?
We've got spirit... Yes we do!
We've got spirit... How 'Bout you!?!?
(repeat twice)

Cali-Nev-Ha Cheer
Cali-Nev-Ha!
Cali-Nev-Ha!
Abooga, booga, booga!
Ha, Ha, Ha!
(Throw your fist over your head)
(Repeat 3x, each time louder)

CNH Rap
From the east to the west!
You Know We're the best!
We're the district with the sting!
And that's why we sing!
We're the bees buzz buzz!
We're the bees buzz buzz!
It's all about the party hardy!
CNH Bees!

Rallies

The CNH Fall Rally is a fundraiser and the largest gathering of Key Clubbers held during the district year. Because of the district's geographic size, two fall rallies are held each year in order to allow for greater ease of attendance. Fall Rally North, held in late October, is currently held in Northern California (Vallejo) at the Six Flags Discovery Kingdom. Fall Rally South, held in mid-November, is held in Southern California (Valencia) at Six Flags Magic Mountain. Thousands of members gather at each of the two theme parks. Because of the sheer number of Key Clubbers at Fall Rally South, the rally is divided into four sessions, with divisions being assigned to specific rally times.

At both fall rallies, all district board members (executive officers, appointed board members, and lieutenant governors) are "auctioned" off to divisions. The winning division is then able to spend a designated period of time with the "purchased" officer.  Funds and ticket sales for both events go toward Pediatric Trauma Program and Pediatric Emergency Medicine programs at the partner hospitals in Oakland, San Diego, Loma Linda, Madera, Honolulu and Reno. In 2009-2010, the fall rallies generated over $120,000, more than double of the previous year.

District convention

The district convention is held each year in March or April, the conclusion of the CNH Key Club year. This convention is held in celebration of the accomplishments of the individual Key Clubber as well as the clubs, divisions and District's achievements. A convention center has been required to host the assembly of massive amounts members at the general sessions, the location of the convention center alternates each year between Northern and Southern California. Workshops are hosted throughout a three-day period covering training and service project information for elected officers to member centered meet and greets and motivational seminars. The Policies International and Elections Committee oversees the election process of the new District Executive Officers and International Officer Candidates. Caucuses are held to allow the members of the District to hear candidate's platforms and ask questions. A House of Delegates assembles with two representatives from every club in the district to vote.

The results of the election are announced Saturday night at the general session. The general sessions also host a variety of talent acts by members as well as the presentation of scholarships and recognition of people and club who have shown outstanding service to the organization. Spirit rallies are conducted at each general session and a spirit stick goes to the group deemed most spirited. On the final day the Incumbent District Board is retired with all current divisional and club officers, the new District Board is installed and all elected club officers gain official control over their positions at that point.

  Recent District Convention Locations
 2022: Reno, NV
 2021: Ontario, CA (held virtually through Zoom due to COVID-19 pandemic)
 2020: Reno, NV (cancelled due to COVID-19 pandemic; many public health agencies recommended cancelling/postponing large events)
 2019: Ontario, CA
 2018: Reno, NV
 2017: Anaheim, CA
 2016: Sacramento, CA
 2015: Anaheim, CA
 2014: Sacramento, CA
 2013: Anaheim, CA
 2012: Santa Clara, CA
 2011: Anaheim, CA
 2010: Sacramento, CA
 2009: Anaheim, CA
 2008: Sacramento, CA
 2007: Long Beach, CA
 2006: San Jose, CA
 2005: Long Beach, CA
 2004: Sacramento, CA
 2003: Ontario, CA
 2002: San Jose, CA
 2001: Long Beach, CA
 2000: Long Beach, CA
 1999: Santa Clara, CA
 1998: Santa Clara, CA
 1997: Anaheim, CA
 1996: Long Beach, CA
 1995: Santa Clara, CA
 1994: Anaheim, CA
 1993: Anaheim, CA
 1992: Santa Clara, CA
 1991: Los Angeles, CA
 1990: Anaheim, CA
 1989: Santa Clara, CA
 1987: Santa Clara, CA
 1986: Anaheim, CA
 1985: Fresno, CA

Past Governors
 John Cooper 1947-1948
 Richard Wilke 1948-1949
 David Price 1949-1950
 Carey McWilliams 1950-1951
 Jay Powell 1952-1953
 R. Richard Austin 1953-1954
 Ronald Mitchell 1954-1955
 Dell Riddle 1955-1956
 Cliff Harmon 1956-1957
 Don Sunukjian 1957-1958
 Travis Montgomery 1958-1959
 Dan Okimoto 1959-1960
 Don Teasley 1960-1961
 Tim O'Brien 1961-1962
 Brad Karelius 1962-1963
 Pat Borunda 1963-1964
 Glenn Kageyama 1964-1965
 Mark Shiveley 1965-1966
 James Mullin 1966-1967
 Kenneth Burns 1967-1968
 David Utley 1968-1969
 Jeryl Saulter 1969-1970
 Steve Carlson 1970-1971
 Robert Spees 1971-1972
 Frank Spees 1972-1973
 Michael Lucia 1973-1974
 Bill CHannell 1974-1975
 John Grant 1975-1976
 Gary Hernandez 1976-1977
 Kirk McAfee 1977-1987
 Richard Annett 1978-1979
 John Baxter 1979-1980
 Richard Correa 1980-1981
 Richard Lambros 1981-1982
 Gene Richardson 1982-1983
 Monte Weiss 1983-1984
 Lori Tsuruda 1984-1985 (first woman elected)
 Arthur Ochoa 1985-1986
 Richard Taylor 1986-1987
 Jeff Nelson 1987-1988
 Janelle McGlothlin 1988-1989
 Michelle Moline 1989-1990
 Kevin Lo 1990-1991
 Bonnie Pennebaker 1991-1992
 Inbal Sansani 1993-1994
 Mary Katherine Flynn 1994-1995
 Yilaap Lai 1995-1996
 Eddie Chen 1996-1997
 Patrick Maurer 1997–1998
 Don Le 1998–1999
 David Chang 1999–2000
 Joe Gaudet 2000–2001
 Dennis Chon 2001–2002
 Annie Le 2002–2003
 David Voce 2003–2004
 Hai Vo 2004–2005
 Elliot Emmer 2005–2006
 Doris Vu 2006–2007
 Dorothy Yen 2007–2008
 Jennifer Zhu 2008–2009
 Jesse Truong 2009–2010
 Diana Nguyen 2010–2011
 Erinn Wong 2011–2012
 Alyssa Yocom 2012—2013
 Victoria Lai 2013–2014
 Jacqueline Tsang 2014–2015
 Joshua Nuesca 2015–2016
 Kevin Myron 2016–2017
 Angelica Garcia 2017–2018
 Jonathan Lum 2018–2019
 Chuofan Yu 2019-2020
 Daniel Min 2020-2021
 Amy Wang 2021-2022

Culture
After divisions have succeeded the sixteen club maximum, they realign into the two or more of the four cardinal directions. 
The District is known for its District Board attire in which District Board members wear all black business attire with a golden necktie.
The CNH District Office is located in Division 15 North.
Sacramento High School is the oldest and founding chapter of Key Club International. It is located in Division 7 North.
The Fall Rally North venue (Six Flags Discovery Kingdom) is located in Division 8.
The Fall Rally South venue (Six Flags Magic Mountain) is located in Division 16 North.
The CNH District is the only district to share the same geographical domain as another Key Club District (CNH KIWIN'S).
The Sandy Nininger Award is the highest honor a Key Clubber in the District can obtain; the Jack Luther Advisor Award is the highest honor the District can bestow upon a faculty or Kiwanis advisor.

References

External links
 Cali-Nev-Ha District Key Club International
 Key Club International

Kiwanis